WQLU (90.9 MHz) is a non-commercial FM radio station licensed to Lynchburg, Virginia, known as "90.9 The Light."  It broadcasts a Christian Top 40 radio format and is owned and operated by Liberty University.  The station also airs Liberty University Flames athletics.

WQLU has an effective radiated power (ERP) of 100 watts.  The transmitter is off Candlers Mountain Road in Lynchburg.

History
Liberty University (then known as Liberty Bible College) got its first student-run radio station in 1980, on the AM dial.  It was a carrier current station available on 550 AM but only covering the campus.

On October 8, 1992, The Federal Communications Commission granted the school a construction permit to build an FM station at 100 watts on 90.9 MHz. Its original call sign was WMMC (for Wall to Wall MusiC). During off-hours, a Christian music service from Boston was broadcast, when Liberty student DJs were not available.

After a transmitter fire, the station was off the air from June to August of 1993.  In 1999, the station switched from its mainstream Christian Contemporary sound to a more youthful, upbeat Christian Top 40 playlist.  In 2003, the station began holding on-the-air fundraisers for listener support.  The station changed its call letters to WQLU in the spring of 2015.

References

External links
 90.9 The Light Online
 

QLU
Radio stations established in 1993
1993 establishments in Virginia
Contemporary Christian radio stations in the United States
Liberty University
QLU